Ernani is an opera by Giuseppe Verdi that debuted in 1844, based on the play Hernani by Victor Hugo.

Ernani may also refer to:

People
 Ernani Braga (1888-1948), Brazilian composer, pianist and conductor
 Ernani Bernardi (1911-2006), American big-band musician and politician
 Ernani Cuenco (1936-1988), Filipino composer, music director and music teacher
 Ernâni Lopes (1942-2010), Portuguese economist and politician
 Ernani Aguiar (born 1950), Brazilian composer and musicologist
 Ernani Pereira (born 1978), Azerbaijani football defender
 Ernani (footballer) (born 1982), Ernani do Nascimento Germano, Brazilian football left-back

Other uses
 Ernani (1903 HMV recording), a 1903 recording of the eponymous opera by the Italian Gramophone Company
 Ernani José Machado Lake, an artificial lake in Lucas do Rio Verde, Brazil

See also
 Hernani (disambiguation)